Sphingomyelin phosphodiesterase 4 is an enzyme that in humans is encoded by the SMPD4 gene.

Model organisms 

Model organisms have been used in the study of SMPD4 function. A conditional knockout mouse line called Smpd4tm2b(KOMP)Wtsi was generated at the Wellcome Trust Sanger Institute. Male and female animals underwent a standardized phenotypic screen to determine the effects of deletion. Additional screens performed:  - In-depth immunological phenotyping

References

Further reading